Alisha Rees (born 16 April 1999) is a British track and field athlete from Scotland who competes as a sprinter. She is the Scottish national record holder over 60m and 100m leading to her  been dubbed ‘the fastest Scottish woman in history’.

Early life
Raised in Torphins, a village in Royal Deeside, Rees played football for Deeside Girls as well as competing in athletics, where she trained in Banchory.

Career

Junior career
Rees was a member of the Scottish team at the Commonwealth Youth Games in 2015 in Samoa. She won silver in the 200m and bronze in the 100m. She also won medals at the European Under-18 Championships, and relay medals at the World and European Under-20 Championships.

Senior career
Rees earned her first Great Britain selection and won 4x100m bronze at the 2019 European Team Championships held in Bydgoszcz, Poland.

In February 2020 she won the silver medal at the British Indoor Athletics Championships behind Amy Hunt.

‘Fastest woman in Scotland’
In 2022 Rees finished second in the British 60m final, lowering her own Scottish record to 7.31. She would later that year also break the 48 year-old Scottish 100m record of Helen Golden, running 11.39 seconds in Dagenham before lowering again that year to 11.30 in Stratford. After this she was given the monicker “the fastest woman in Scotland” by the media.

Rees captained the a Scottish team at the DNA International in February 2022. In May 2022 she was part of the Scottish 4x100m team that set a new national record time of 44.75 at the Diamond League meeting in Birmingham. Rees made her Commonwealth Games debut in Birmingham in 2022. where she reached the semi-finals of the Women's 100m, and qualified for the final and finished eighth as part of the Women's 4 x 100m Relay team.

In January 2023 Rees lowered her national record in the 60m to 7.27 seconds, racing in Lee Valley. In
February 2023 Rees won a bronze medal in the 60m race at the British Indoor Athletics Championships in Birmingham.

Personal life
Rees began a degree in sociology at Loughborough University in 2017. In September 2022 she moved to London to start an MSc in inequality and social science at the London School of Economics.

References

External links

1999 births
Living people
Scottish female sprinters 
British female athletes